Arseniy Lavrentyev (born 1 February 1983) is a Russian-born Portuguese professional swimmer, specialising in Open water swimming. He competed at the 2008 and 2012 Summer Olympics.

References

Portuguese male long-distance swimmers
1983 births
Living people
Olympic swimmers of Portugal
Swimmers at the 2008 Summer Olympics
Swimmers at the 2012 Summer Olympics

Portuguese people of Russian descent